D.R.U.G.S. is the debut studio album by American post-hardcore band Destroy Rebuild Until God Shows released on February 22, 2011.

Production and recording

As of August 25, 2010, the band is situated in Los Angeles recording their upcoming album with producer John Feldmann. (2002). According to a Twitter post made by Craig Owens on October 17, 2010, D.R.U.G.S.' album is finished and currently is waiting release. A similar post was also made by Matt Good a day later.

On November 11, 2010, Destroy Rebuild Until God Shows released their first single, "If You Think This Song Is About You, It Probably Is." On December 6, 2010, they released their second single, "Mr. Owl Ate My Metal Worm," (which is one of two songs, along with "Laminated E.T. Animal," whose titles are both palindromes).

On January 17, 2011, a supposed "sex tape" featuring Craig Owens and another woman was released, along with stills, on the website Is Anyone Up?. The video turned out to be a hoax, as the ending revealed it to be promotion for the music video D.R.U.G.S.' single "Sex Life" which would premiere the next day, January 18.

Also on January 18, pre-orders for their Regular and Deluxe versions were made available on iTunes. On February 1, "My Swagger Has a First Name" was released for streaming on the internet.

On February 9, 2011, Alternative Press released an exclusive album reveal video for "The Only Thing You Talk About" which is Destroy Rebuild Until God Shows's legal rendition of the song "Thermacare" originally by Chiodos.
On February 10, 2011, D.R.U.G.S. released another album reveal video for the song "Graveyard Dancing" on MTV.  Since then, they have released the songs on various media outlets, including "Laminated E.T. Animal", "Stop Reading, Start Doing Pushups" and "I'm The Rehab, You're The Drugs" on AbsolutePunk, Noisecreep, and Friends or Enemies. An album reveal video has been released for every song on the album.

The music video for "If You Think This Song Is About You, It Probably Is," was released on December 2, 2010. The official video for the song "Sex Life", featuring the band performing this time, was released on April 7, 2011.

On July 12, 2011, D.R.U.G.S. released a live EP titled "Live From Hot Topic", which includes 5 live versions of songs from the album: "The Only Thing You Talk About", "My Swagger has a First Name", "Mr. Owl Ate My Metal Worm", "Graveyard Dancing" and "If You Think This Song is About You, It Probably Is".

Sales

The album sold 14,000+ copies in its first week debuting at No. 29 on the Billboard 200. The album has since hit No. 1 on Billboard's U.S. Hard Rock list.

Track listing

Personnel
Destroy Rebuild Until God Shows
Craig Owens – lead vocals, keyboards
Matt Good – lead guitar, vocals, keyboards
Nick Martin – rhythm guitar, vocals
Adam Russell – bass guitar
Aaron Stern – drums, percussion

Production
Produced, Mixed, Additional bass, String arrangements and vocals by John Feldmann
Engineered by John Feldmann,  Brandon Paddock and Spencer Hoad
Additional programming by John Feldmann and Brandon Paddock
A&R by John Feldmann, Craig Aaronson and Pete Wentz
Product manager: Scott Frost
Creative directors: Frank Maddocks, Donny Phillips and Norman Wonderly
Package design by Donny Phillips
Illustration by Mark Brown
Photography by Tamar Levine

References
 Citations

Sources

External links
 thisisdrugs.com

2011 debut albums
Destroy Rebuild Until God Shows albums
Sire Records albums
Albums produced by John Feldmann